Jiao Yulu is a 1990 Chinese biographical film directed by Wang Jixing and written by Fang Yihua. It stars Li Xuejian, Li Rentang, and Zhou Zongyin. The film tells the story of Jiao Yulu overseeing the development of Lankao County in Henan province from 1962 to 1964. The film premiered in China in April 1990.

Plot
In late 1962, Jiao Yulu was appointed the second party boss of Lankao County in Henan province. This region had declined into poverty and ignorance. The local residents had to contend with wind and sand storms, waterlogging, and alkaline lands. He was soon promoted to party boss because of his excellent work. Due to years of toil, Jiao Yulu broke down from constant overwork and suffered from liver cancer. On May 14, 1964, he died at the age of forty-two.

Cast
 Li Xuejian as Jiao Yulu
 Li Rentang as Commissioner Zhao.
 Zhou Zongyin 
 Zhang Ying as Xu Junya, Jiao Yulu's wife.
 Tian Yuan
 Liang Ying
 Lu Shan

Accolades

References

External links
 
 

1990s biographical drama films
Biographical films about politicians
Chinese biographical drama films
Films shot in Henan
Films set in Henan
1990 drama films
1990 films
1990s Mandarin-language films